Marta Huerta de Aza (born 31 March 1990) is a Spanish teacher and first division football referee whose importance in Spain was recognised with the Vicente Acevedo Trophy.

Life
Born in Palencia, she lives in the Canary Islands. She became interested in becoming a referee after she went on a course when she was fifteen. She has been a FIFA international match referee since 2016.

She works as a teacher and because she is not considered an elite athlete in the Canaries she has to juggle her part-time teaching with her commitments as a referee.

In 2017 she refereed her first First Women's Division game. She was awarded the Vicente Acevedo Trophy as the best referee in Spain.

On 9 February 2019, she was the referee for the 2020 Spanish Women's Soccer Super Cup final. The match was between Real Sociedad and FC Barcelona at the Helmántico Stadium in Salamanca (The score was 1-10).

On 3 October 2021 she was a referee in a First Division game. The game was between Getafe and Real Sociedad. The other referee was Jorge Figueroa Vázquez and they had two assistants: Guadalupe Porras Ayuso and Yeray Carreño Cabrera. She became the first woman to serve as the fourth referee in the men's First Division. In May 2022, she was a referee in UEFA Women's Champions League quarter finals, between Bayern Munich and PSG.

She refereed the Women Euro 2022 football game between England and Austria on July 6, 2022.

She and Jorge Figueroa Vázquez have been chosen as referees for the 2023 FIFA Women's World Cup.

Private life
She is married and has a daughter who was born in 2021.

References

Spanish referees and umpires
Sportspeople from the Province of Santa Cruz de Tenerife
People from Palencia
Sportspeople from the Province of Palencia
UEFA Women's Euro 2022 referees
1990 births
Living people
Women referees and umpires